Billy Vunipola (born 3 November 1992) is a professional rugby union player who plays at Number 8 for Saracens in the Gallagher Premiership and for the England national team. Born in Australia to Tongan parents, he qualified for England through residency, having lived and been schooled in Wales and England since he was a young child. He made his England debut in 2013 and has since won over 50 caps.

Early life 
Vunipola was born in Sydney in Australia to Tongan parents, but moved to Wales with his family as a young child after his father Feʻao Vunipola signed for Pontypool RFC in 1998. He was educated at Porth Infants School and Griffithstown Junior School, playing for New Panteg RFC with Joe Lane. He subsequently moved to The Castle School in Thornbury, Gloucestershire, England where he played junior rugby for Thornbury RFC before being given a scholarship to attend Harrow School.

Club career

Wasps
While at Harrow School, Vunipola joined the Wasps Academy. He made his senior team debut in 2011–12 season and played 30 matches over two seasons before leaving at the end of the 2012–2013 season.

Saracens
Vunipola signed a contract in January 2013 to move to Saracens at the end of the 2012–13 Premiership season. During his time at Saracens he has won four Premiership titles in 2015, 2016, 2018 and 2019, with Vunipola featuring in all four finals and scoring a try in the 2018 final against Exeter Chiefs. He also helped Saracens win the European Rugby Champions Cup three times in four seasons; beating Racing 92 in 2016 and the following year defeating ASM Clermont Auvergne at Murrayfield to retain their title. In the 2019 final Vunipola scored a try in the victory over Leinster at St James' Park.

After Saracens were relegated from the Premiership due to salary cap breaches, Vunipola scored two tries in the 2021 Championship play-off final as they overcame Ealing Trailfinders to gain promotion and an immediate return to the top flight.

International career

England
In 2010 Vunipola was vice-captain for the England under-18 team that toured South Africa. He was also a member of the England under-20 side that finished seventh at the 2012 IRB Junior World Championship. In January 2013 he was called up to the England Saxons and subsequently trained with the senior England Squad during the 2013 Six Nations Championship.

Vunipola was included in the squad for their 2013 tour of South America and on 8 June 2013 made his senior England debut in the opening Test against Argentina in Salta, coming off the bench to score a try in England's 32–3 win. Earlier in the trip he played in a tour game against a Consur XV, and scored a hat-trick of tries in six minutes.

Vunipola scored tries against Italy and France during the 2015 Six Nations Championship as England finished runners up. He was selected for the 2015 Rugby World Cup and scored a try in the opening match of the tournament against Fiji. A knee injury sustained in the pool defeat against Wales ended his participation at the World Cup.

In January 2016 new head coach Eddie Jones included Vunipola in his squad for the 2016 Six Nations Championship and he started all the fixtures during the tournament as England achieved their first grand slam in over a decade. Later that year he scored a try in the last game of their summer tour of Australia to complete a series whitewash. The following year saw Vunipola score a try against Scotland in the penultimate round of the 2017 Six Nations Championship and he then started in the last match of the tournament loss away to Ireland which ensured England failed to complete consecutive grand slams and also brought an end to a record equalling eighteen successive Test victories.

Vunipola was chosen for the 2019 Rugby World Cup and scored a try in a warm-up match against Wales. He subsequently scored a try in the pool game against the United States and won his 50th cap in the semi-final victory over New Zealand. He then started in the 2019 Rugby World Cup Final defeat against South Africa.

After the World Cup Vunipola was a member of the side that won the 2020 Six Nations Championship and later that year started for the England side that defeated France during extra-time of the Autumn Nations Cup final.

British & Irish Lions
In April 2017, Vunipola was selected as one of the 41 British & Irish Lions to tour New Zealand in the summer alongside his brother Mako Vunipola. However, due to an ongoing shoulder injury, he withdrew from the squad on 21 May 2017 and was replaced by England back-row teammate James Haskell. Vunipola was not selected by coach Warren Gatland for the 2021 tour.

International tries

Personal life
Vunipola's father is former Tonga captain Fe'ao Vunipola and his mother, Iesinga Vunipola, a Methodist minister in High Wycombe. He is the nephew of two other former international players, Manu and 'Elisi Vunipola, who both represented Tonga in the 1990s. His brother, Mako Vunipola is his teammate with Saracens and England.

Honours
England
 Six Nations Championship: 2016, 2017, 2020
 Autumn Nations Cup: 2020
 Rugby World Cup runner-up: 2019

Saracens
 European Rugby Champions Cup: 2015–16, 2016-17, 2018-19
 Premiership: 2014-15, 2015-16, 2017-18, 2018-19
 RFU Championship: 2020-21

References

External links
ESPN Profile

1992 births
Living people
Rugby union players from Sydney
English rugby union players
England international rugby union players
Australian rugby union players
Australian emigrants to England
English people of Tongan descent
Australian sportspeople of Tongan descent
People educated at Harrow School
People educated at The Castle School
Saracens F.C. players
Wasps RFC players
Rugby union flankers
Rugby union number eights
Australian expatriates in Wales